is a TV station affiliated with Fuji News Network (FNN) and Fuji Network System (FNS) in Toyama, Toyama.  It is broadcast in Toyama Prefecture. Established in 1969, the station was branded as T34 until December 31, 1993.

TV channel

Digital Television 
 Toyama 28ch JOTH-DTV

Tandem office 
Fukumitsu 58ch
Unazuki 50ch
Takaoka-Futagami 40ch
Hosoiri 40ch
Ōyama-omi 40ch

Program

External links
 The official website of Toyama Television 

Fuji News Network
Television stations in Japan
Television channels and stations established in 1969
Mass media in Toyama (city)